The Sumter Braves were a minor league baseball team located in Sumter, South Carolina.  The team played in the South Atlantic League, and were affiliated with the Atlanta Braves.  Their home stadium was Riley Park.

History
In 1984, the Anderson Braves relocated to Sumter. In 1991, the affiliate shifted to Macon, Georgia and became known as the Macon Braves, eventually becoming today's Rome Braves of Rome, Georgia. An expansion team was awarded to Sumter right after the Sumter Braves relocated and as an affiliate of the Montreal Expos, and Sumter became known as the Sumter Flyers. In 1992, the franchise relocated to Albany, Georgia as the Albany Polecats, eventually becoming today's Delmarva Shorebirds of Salisbury, Maryland.

Notably, 2014 Baseball Hall of Fame inductee Tom Glavine pitched for Sumter in 1985.

The ballpark
Sumner teams played at Riley Park. Located at Church Street & DuBose Street, 29150.  It is still in use today as home to the University of South Carolina Sumter Fire Ants and Morris College Hornet baseball teams. The  Sumter Chicks (1949–1950) of the Tri-State League, Sumter Indians (1970) and Sumter Astros (1971) of the Western Carolinas League and the Sumter Braves (1985–1990) and Sumter Flyers (1991) of the South Atlantic League all played at Riley Park.

Notable alumni

Baseball Hall of Fame alumni
 Tom Glavine (1985) Inducted, 2014

Notable alumni
 Shane Andrews (1991)
 Jeff Blauser (1985) 2 x MLB All-Star
 Jolbert Cabrera (1991)
 Vinny Castilla (1990) 2 x MLB All-Star
 Kevin Foster (1991)
 Ron Gant (1985, 1989) 2 x MLB All-Star 
 Ryan Klesko (1989-1990) MLB All-Star
 Mark Lemke (1985)
 Al Martin (1986-1987)
 Carlos Perez (1991) MLB All-Star
 Eddie Perez (1989-1990) NLCS Most Valuable Player
 Kirk Rueter (1991)
 Brian Snitker (1986, MGR)
 Rondell White (1991) MLB All-Star
 Mark Wohlers (1989-1990) MLB All-Star
 Ned Yost (1988-1990, MGR) Manager: 2015 World Series Champion Kansas City Royals

Year-by-year record

Sumter Braves

Sumter Flyers

References

Defunct South Atlantic League teams
Professional baseball teams in South Carolina
Atlanta Braves minor league affiliates
Montreal Expos minor league affiliates
Defunct minor league baseball teams
Baseball teams established in 1985
Sports clubs disestablished in 1991
1985 establishments in South Carolina
1991 disestablishments in South Carolina
Defunct baseball teams in South Carolina
Baseball teams disestablished in 1991
Sumter, South Carolina